Eltz is a German noble family.

Eltz may also refer to:


People
 Jakob Graf zu Eltz (1921–2006), Croatian politician
 Theodore von Eltz (1893–1964), American film actor

Places
 Eltz Castle, a medieval castle on the Moselle River, Germany
 Eltz Manor, a Baroque palace in Vukovar, Croatia

Other uses
 Eltz Feud, a 14th-century feud between rulers of Trier and members of the knightly class

See also
 Elz (disambiguation)
 Jakob von Eltz-Rübenach (1510–1581), Archbishop-Elector of Trier
 Kuno von Eltz-Rübenach (1904–1945), German politician
 Philipp Karl von Eltz-Kempenich (1665–1743), Archbishop-Elector of Mainz